The Hardy Boys: The Hidden Theft (originally to be titled The Hardy Boys: The Tower Treasure) is the first title in The Hardy Boys PC game series created by JoWood Productions and The Adventure Company. It was based on The Tower Treasure, the first book in the book series. The game was released September 30, 2008. A sequel was made called The Hardy Boys: The Perfect Crime; this Hidden Object game was critically panned.

Plot summary
The vault of the Spencer Mansion is robbed, and the Bayport Police call on brother detectives Frank and Joe Hardy for help to tie up some loose ends. The teen sleuths soon find themselves in the middle of a major criminal investigation that takes them out of their hometown Bayport, and into New York City. But the pieces don't add up, and Frank and Joe find themselves embroiled in a drama of sinister proportions, and they begin to suspect the recent theft is somehow linked to something from the past.

Critical reception 
Just Adventure gave the game a B+.

References

Hidden Theft
2008 video games
Adventure games
Point-and-click adventure games
Mystery video games
Detective video games
Windows games
Wii games
Video games developed in Taiwan
The Adventure Company games
Hidden Theft
First-person adventure games
Puzzle video games
JoWooD Entertainment games